Sylvester Seay (born July 29, 1985) is an American former professional basketball player. He last played for the Akita Northern Happinets of the Japanese bj league. He played college basketball for Arizona State and Fresno State.

College statistics

|-
| style="text-align:left;"| 2005–06
| style="text-align:left;"| Arizona State
| 26 ||17  ||11.3  || .431 || .347 || .476|| 1.96 ||0.50  || 0.38 || 0.50 || 4.65
|-
| style="text-align:left;"| 2006–07
| style="text-align:left;"| Arizona State
| 12 ||1  ||9.3  || .340 || .167 || .667|| 2.00 ||0.58  || 0.75 || 0.50 || 3.33
|-
| style="text-align:left;"| 2008–09
| style="text-align:left;"| Fresno State
| 34 ||30  ||30.0  || .447 || .370 || .692||5.76  ||1.15  || 1.03 || 1.71 || 15.32
|-
| style="text-align:left;"| 2009–10
| style="text-align:left;"| Fresno State
| 33 ||32  ||29.4  || .452 || .286 || .721|| 6.06 ||1.45  || 1.03 || 1.09 || 14.24
|-
|- class="sortbottom"
! style="text-align:center;" colspan=2|  Career

!105 ||80 || 22.8 ||.442  || .320 ||.690  || 4.49 ||1.02  || 0.84 ||1.08  || 10.97
|-

NCAA Awards & Honors
WAC All-Conference Second Team – 2009
WAC All-Conference Honorable Mention – 2010

Career statistics 

|-
| align="left" |  2010
| align="left" | ECC 
| 11 ||  || 10.0 || .422 || .273 || .630 || 2.8 || 0.6 || 0.5 || 0.2 || 6.6
|-
| align="left" |  2010–11
| align="left" | Waikato 
| 4 ||  || 31.0 || .490 || .300 || .769 || 9.3 || 0.8 || 2.3 || 1.5 || 15.3
|-
| align="left" |  2011–12
| align="left" | Norrköping/Tijuana
| 28 || 18 || 22.2 || .472 || .347 || .776 || 3.75 || 1.14 || 0.64 || 1.32 || 11.79
|-
| align="left" |  2012–13
| align="left" | Tijuana
| 6|| 6 || 25.5 || .328 || .346 || .769 || 4.33 || 0.83 || 0.33 || 0.33 || 9.50
|-
| align="left" |  2013–14
| align="left" | Akita
| 16 ||  || 15.3 || .328 || .293 || .783 || 4.9 || 0.8 || 0.7 || 0.5 || 6.9
|-

Personal
Sylvester has two kids, James(2010)and Layla(2013) with his former spouse, Sandra Flores. His uncle, Mark Seay, is a former NFL football wide receiver. Sylvester currently resides in Moreno Valley, Ca.

References

External links
 

1985 births
Living people
Akita Northern Happinets players
American expatriate basketball people in Australia
American expatriate basketball people in Japan
American expatriate basketball people in Kosovo
American expatriate basketball people in Mexico
American expatriate basketball people in South Korea
American expatriate basketball people in Sweden
Arizona State Sun Devils men's basketball players
Basketball players from California
Fresno State Bulldogs men's basketball players
Jeonju KCC Egis players
Norrköping Dolphins players
Tijuana Zonkeys players
American men's basketball players
Forwards (basketball)